Infigen Energy (Infigen), operating under this name since 29 April 2009, is a developer, owner and operator of renewable energy generation assets in Australia. Infigen's wind farm portfolio has an installed capacity of 557 MW. Most of Infigen's assets generate electricity from renewable sources and are eligible to sell Large-scale Generation Certificates (LGCs) under the mandatory Renewable Energy Target scheme, which operates in Australia under the Renewable Energy (Electricity) Act 2000. Since 2020, Infigen Energy has been a subsidiary of Iberdrola.

Infigen also operates open cycle gas turbine power stations Smithfield Energy Facility in New South Wales and will take on Temporary Generation South in South Australia in 2020, in addition to a grid-scale battery near the Lake Bonney Wind Farm.

Infigen previously owned a wind farm portfolio in the US. In October 2015 Infigen sold its US wind business to an Arclight Capital Partners, LLC for US$274.4 million. The US wind farms are subsequently operated by Leeward Renewable Energy, LLC.

Infigen reports under the Carbon Disclosure Project.

Infigen is a member of the Australian Energy Council and the Clean Energy Council.

History 
The name Infigen is derived from the words infinite and generation. Infigen Energy listed on the Australian Securities Exchange (ASX) in October 2005 under the code BBW. When it joined the ASX, it had three wind farms with an installed capacity of nearly 150 megawatts. According to a 2007 article, it had 33 wind farms with an installed capacity of 1,200 megawatts. As of 2007, it was the world's fourth largest owner of wind farms and are Australia's biggest wind power supplier.

In 2009, Infigen changed its name from Babcock & Brown Wind Partners after branching out from troubled parent company Babcock & Brown. ASX code IFN.

In 2012, Infigen hosted its first "Run with the Wind" 10-kilometre fun run at its Woodlawn Wind Farm. The following year, the company hosted their second fun run and were supported by the Greater Western Sydney Giants. In both races, the race was won by Olympian runner Martin Dent, and proceeds were donated to charity. Infigen hosted the fun run in the following years in 2014, 2015, 2016 and 2017. It was announced that in 2018 the fun run will be held on Sunday, 21 October.

In 2013, the company collaborated with Danish wind turbines manufacturer Vestas on the wind energy campaign Act on Facts.

In 2015, Infigen joined the Carbon Disclosure Project's Road to Paris climate commitments, also known as We Mean Business coalition. The same year Infigen joined Australia's CitySwitch Green Office program, which is a partnership between businesses and local, state and federal governments working together to make a positive impact on climate change.

In 2016, Infigen announced the retirement of its managing director and CEO, Miles George and the appointment of Ross Rolfe as his successor with effect from the conclusion of the company's annual general meeting on 17 November 2016. Miles George had been the managing director and CEO of Infigen since 2009.

In 2017, Infigen announced the retirement of Mike Hutchinson as chairman of the board and appointment of non-executive director Len Gill in succession to Mr Hutchinson as chairman of the board.

Infigen is a signatory to Caring for Climate, UN Global Compact.

In June 2020 Credit Suisse launched an after-market takeover bid on Infigen Energy on behalf of UAC Energy. A competing takeover offer was launched by Iberdrola. The Iberdrola offer was ultimately successful, with UAC selling its stake to Iberdrola on 9 September 2020.

Australian wind farms 
Infigen Energy holds 100% equity interests in seven Australian wind farms for a total of 670MW capacity, and contracts two others for 89MW. All of Infigen's wind farms are accredited by GreenPower.

Sources: GreenPower accredited generators

Projects in development.

Australian solar farms 
Infigen Energy holds 100% equity interests in its Australian solar farm.

Source: Company website

U.S. wind farms 
Infigen Energy previously owned 18 renewable energy assets in nine states across the U.S.: They are now owned by Leeward Energy, owned by ArcLight Capital Partners. In 2014, EDPR had operating expenses of $25.1/MWh for its US wind farms.

Source:

References

External links 
 

Renewable energy companies of Australia
Wind power in Australia
Wind power companies of the United States
Companies based in Sydney
Energy companies established in 2003
Renewable resource companies established in 2003
Australian companies established in 2003
Companies formerly listed on the Australian Securities Exchange
Electric power companies of Australia